The discography of American singer Ty Dolla Sign consists of three studio albums, two extended plays (EP), seven mixtapes and forty-three singles (as well as twenty-seven singles as a featured artist).

In May 2011, Ty Dolla Sign released his debut mixtape, House on the Hill, which includes his debut single "All Star" featuring Joe Moses. After releasing a few more mixtapes throughout 2011 and 2012, Ty Dolla Sign signed a recording contract with Wiz Khalifa's record label Taylor Gang. In January 2014, he released his major label debut Beach House EP, via Taylor Gang Records and Atlantic Records. The EP includes hit singles "Paranoid" and "Or Nah". Ty Dolla Sign released his debut studio album, Free TC on November 13, 2015. The album includes the hit singles "Blasé", "Saved" and "Wavy". Ty Dolla Sign topped the Billboard Hot 100 in 2018 with his feature on American rapper and singer Post Malone's song "Psycho", and also had chart success as a featured artist on songs such as "Work from Home", "Swalla" and "Hot Girl Summer". Ty Dolla Sign's third studio album Featuring Ty Dolla Sign was released October 23, 2020 and is his highest-charting album to date, debuting at number four on the Billboard 200.

Studio albums

Collaborative albums

EPs

Mixtapes

Free mixtapes

Commercial mixtapes

Singles

As lead artist

As featured artist

Promotional singles

Other charted and certified songs

Other guest appearances

Production discography

Notes

References

Discographies of American artists
Hip hop discographies